Shoot Speed – More Dirty Hits is a compilation album by Scottish rock band Primal Scream, released in Japan on 17 March 2004 by Columbia Records. The album attempts to compile and collect significant singles, album tracks, B-sides and remixes not released on the greatest hits album Dirty Hits (2003), and also acts as a B-sides compilation. Unlike its predecessor, Shoot Speed features music from Primal Scream's entire career, collecting tracks released before their third studio album Screamadelica (1991).

The album peaked at number 48 on the Oricon album chart in Japan.

Track listing

References

Primal Scream albums
2004 compilation albums